Teria Yarhere is a Nigerian rapper from Delta State who performs under the name M Trill (stylised as M-Trill or M.Trill). He released his debut studio album Number One in 2008 along with a follow-up mixtape entitled Ladies and Gentlemen (2010). That same year, he won the "Best West African Act"  at the Channel O Music Video Awards for his single "Bounce". M Trill has been featured on songs with Timaya, Cyrus da Virus, Ruggedman, Slim Burna, 2shots, A-Q, Kraftmatiks, Modenine, Godwon, Evaezi, and Pyrelli among others. He was ranked by BellaNaija magazine as one of the illest rappers in the game.

Biography
In 2012, Trill linked up with fellow Nigerian artist Slim Burna and the pair recorded a song called "Oya Na" which was later released in May that same year.M-Trill was also honoured alongside Timaya, Duncan Mighty, Timi Dakolo, Sodi Cookey and Becky Enyioma at the 4th annual Odudu Music Awards in Nigeria, also tagged "Niger Delta's Biggest Awards Ceremony".

In 2013, M-Trill teamed up with an up-and-coming rapper known as Rraz. The duo which go by the name SSS (South South Syndicate) began working on a collaborative project. Their first single "Fastlanes" has Trilla and Rraz rapping over 'Eminem and Royce d 5'9′s single. It was mixed with additional production by Charlie X and Sean Stan.

Musical influences
M-Trill cites Jay-Z, Nas, The Notorious B.I.G., Snoop Dogg, Tupac Shakur, Dr. Dre as his musical influences. He also states that part of his childhood revolved around African music, naming the likes of Onyeka Onwenu, Salif Keita, Youssou N'Dour, Mieway, Koffi Olomide, and Sunny Ade as the few artists he listened to.

Discography
2008: Number One
2010: Ladies and Gentlemen

Awards and nominations

Channel O Music Video Awards

!Ref
|-
|rowspan="1"|2008
|"Bounce"
|Best West African Video
|
|

African Music Awards

!Ref
|-
|rowspan="1"|2009
|"Number one"
|Best new act 
|
|

Odudu Music Awards

!Ref
|-
|rowspan="1"|2012
|"Honorary Award"
|For contribution to the growth of the PH entertainment industry 
|
|

See also

 List of people from Port Harcourt
 List of Nigerians

References

External links
M Trill on Twitter

Living people
Nigerian male rappers
Rappers from Port Harcourt
21st-century Nigerian musicians
University of Port Harcourt alumni
Port Harcourt hip hop
1979 births
21st-century male musicians